The Indonesia women's national futsal team represents Indonesia in international women's futsal competitions and is controlled by the Football Association of Indonesia, which is a member of the Asian Football Confederation.

Achievements

Women's Futsal World Tournament record

AFC Women's Futsal Asian Cup record

Futsal at the Asian Indoor and Martial Arts Games record

Futsal at the Southeast Asian Games record

Honours

Players

Current squad
The following players were called up for 2022 NSDF Women's Futsal Championship  in  Thailand.

Results

The following is a list of match results in the last 12 months, as well as any future matches that have been scheduled.

See also
 Indonesia women's national football team
 Indonesia national men's futsal team
 Indonesia national football team
 Indonesia national beach soccer team

References

External links

Asian women's national futsal teams
Futsal
National
2011 establishments in Indonesia
Women's football in Indonesia